Intel PRO/Wireless is a series of Intel wireless products developed by Intel. These products include wireless network adapters, access points, and routers that are designed to provide high-speed wireless connectivity for computers, laptops, and other devices. Intel PRO/Wireless products use various wireless technologies, including Wi-Fi (IEEE 802.11) and Bluetooth, to provide wireless connectivity. Intel PRO/Wireless network adapters allow devices to connect to wireless networks, while access points and routers create wireless networks that devices can connect to. 

Intel PRO/Wireless products are commonly used in homes, offices, and other settings where wireless connectivity is desired. They are known for their high performance and reliability, and are often used in business environments where a reliable wireless connection is critical. Intel PRO/Wireless products are also used in some public places, such as airports, hotels, and coffee shops, where they can be used to provide wireless access to the Internet for travelers and other patrons.

History
Afte‏r the release of the wireless products called Intel Pro/Wireless 2100, 2200BG/2225BG/2915ABG and 3945ABG in 2005, Intel was criticized for not granting free redistribution rights for the firmware  necessary to be included in the operating systems for the wireless devices to operate. As a result of this, Intel became a target of campaigns to allow free operating systems to include binary firmware on terms acceptable to the open source community. Linspire-Linux creator Michael Robertson outlined the difficult position that Intel was in releasing to Open Source, as Intel did not want to upset their large customer Microsoft. Theo de Raadt of OpenBSD also claimed that Intel is being "an Open Source fraud" after an Intel employee presented a distorted view of the situation on an open-source conference. In spite of the negative attention Intel received as a result of the wireless dealings, the binary firmware  still has not gained a license compatible with free software principles.

Hardware 

The successor to the PRO/Wireless series is Intel Wireless WiFi Link.

See also 
 Comparison of open-source wireless drivers
 FIPS 140
 Wireless LAN

References

External links 
 Official webpage.
 Intel PROSet/Wireless Software.
 Intel® Driver Update Utility.
 2200 Linux drivers

PRO Wireless
Wireless networking
Intel products